Saxena is an Indian surname primarily found in northern and Central India. Kayastha in origin, it derives from the Sanskrit word sakhisena meaning “friend of the army”. Notable people bearing it include:

Abha Saxena, the Coordinator of the Global Health Ethics Unit of the WHO in Geneva
Abhishek Saxena, Indian Bollywood and Punjabi film director 
Anuraag Saxena, Indian activist, commentator and founder of the India Pride Project
Anuj Saxena (born 1967), Indian producer
Arvind Saxena (born 1955), Indian chairman of the Union Public Service Commission
Ashutosh Saxena, Indian-American computer scientist and entrepreneur
Avadh Saxena, the American Group Leader of Physics of Condensed Matter and Complex Systems Group (T-4) at Los Alamos National Laboratory
Banarsi Prasad Saxena, Indian historian
Girish Chandra Saxena, former governor of Jammu and Kashmir
Gopaldas Neeraj, Indian poet and author
Gunjan Saxena, Indian Airforce Officer
Harshit Saxena (born 1985), Indian singer and composer
Harshita Saxena,  the winner of Pantaloons Femina Miss India International 2009 title
Iresh Saxena (born 1984), Bengal cricketer
Jalaj Sahai Saxena (born 1986), Indian cricketer 
Jatin Sahay Saxena (born 1982), Indian first-class cricketer
Kalpana Saxena, senior officer with the Indian Police Service
K. P. Saxena (1932-2013), Hindi satirist and writer
Krishna Gopal Saxena (1912–2003), Indian homoeopathic physician
Manisha Saxena (born 1993), Indian model and television actress
N. C. Saxena, Indian member of the Planning Commission and of the National Advisory Council
Neelam Saxena Chandra (born 1969), Indian poet and author
Neha Saxena, an Indian television actress
Neha Saxena, a film actress who acts mainly Malayalam, Kannada, Tamil and Telugu, Hindi language films
Nitin Saxena, Indian computer scientist
Parag Saxena (born 1955), Hindi Founding General Partner and CEO of New Silk Route
PN Saxena (1925-1999), Indian academic and founder Chairman of the Department of Pharmacology, Jawaharlal Nehru Medical College
Poonam Kishore Saxena (born 1953), Indian Director General of the Income Tax Investigation agency
Rajan Saxena, Indian management academic and the Vice-Chancellor of the SVKM's NMIM deemed university in Mumbai
Rajan Saxena (physician), Indian Dean of the Surgical Gastroenterology Department at Sanjay Gandhi Postgraduate Institute of Lucknow
Rakesh Saxena (born 1952), Indian convicted criminal, financier and trader
Ramesh Saxena (1944-2011), Indian cricketer
Sapan Saxena, Indian author, best known for his novel Finders, Keepers (Saxena novel) & UNNS-The Captivation
Sarveshwar Dayal Saxena (1927-2003), Indian Hindi Poet
Saumitra Saxena (born 1976), United States based poet of Indian origin
Sharat Saxena, Indian actor
Shekhar Saxena, recipient of the 2017 Leon Eisenberg Award
Shibban Lal Saxena, Indian politician and Freedom Fighter
Sushil Kumar Saxena, Indian musicologist, academic and scholar 
Vijay Saxena (1968-1994), Indian actor
Vineet Ashokkumar Saxena (born 1980), Indian cricketer
Virendra Saxena, Indian actor
W. Hansraj Saxena, former Deputy Managing Director of Sun Pictures

Lists of people by surname